The Laois Intermediate Football Championship is an annual Gaelic football competition contested by mid-tier Laois GAA clubs. The Laois County Board of the Gaelic Athletic Association has organised it since 1907.

The Heath are the title holders (2022) defeating Arles–Kilcruise in the Final.

Format
The Intermediate Championship has a 'back door' and operates similarly to the Senior Championship (and Junior Championship C only) by going for a straight knockout but the 'back door' is in place for anyone losing out.

The draw is first made for round 1 of the championship. The draw is then made for Round 2 of the championship.

The final is held in O'Moore Park.

Honours
The trophy presented to the winners is the ?

The winners of the Laois Intermediate Championship qualify to represent their county in the Leinster Intermediate Club Football Championship. The winners can, in turn, go on to play in the All-Ireland Intermediate Club Football Championship. They often do well outside the county, with the likes of Ballyroan Abbey (2008) and Crettyard (2005) among the clubs from Laois to win at least one Leinster Championship after winning the Laois Intermediate Football Championship. Ballyroan Abbey are the only Laois GAA club to have played in Leinster finals at senior and intermediate, Galway GAA club St Michael's narrowly defeating them in the All-Ireland semi-final.

History
It was first held in 1907, with Killenard the victors.

There was no championship in 1911, and none again from 1913 through 1917 and 1919 through 1933.

In the mid-1990s, Rosenallis won the Intermediate Championship straight after winning the Junior Championship, putting back-to-back titles together.

It was once the "Campion Sparrow Laois Intermediate Football Championship" for sponsorship reasons (as recently as 2012) but no more.

The 2017 final went to a replay before Emo got the better of Portlaoise.

During the pandemic year of 2020, the Laois Intermediate Football Championship achieved the distinction of being the only adult football championship completed in the county that year.

List of finals

Wins listed by club

 Clonaslee–St Manman's (6): 1981, 1998, 2002, 2009, 2015, 2020

 Ballylinan (5): 1944 (earliest?)... 1961...

 Annanough (5): 1936, 1940, 1946, 1949, 1978

 Portlaoise (5): 1939, 1956, 1972, 1975, 1982

 Crettyard (4): 1965, 1976, 1984, 2005

 Timahoe (4): 1962, 2000, 2004, 2010

 Killeshin (4): 1958, 1974, 1993, 2011

 The Heath (4): 1943, 1953, 1986, 2022

 St Fintan's Hospital (3): 1951, 1960, 1970

 Barrowhouse (3): 1980, 1985, 1992

 Arles–Killeen (3): 1997, 2001, 2003 

 Emo (3): 1964, 2012, 2017

 Courtwood (3): 1971, 1987, 2018

 O'Dempsey's (3): 1952, 1977, 2016

 Arles–Kilcruise (2): 1967, 1999

 Mountmellick (2): 1968, 2006 

 Ballyroan Abbey (2): 2008, 2013

 Rosenallis (2): 1995, 2019

 Park–Ratheniska (2): 1988, 2021

 Jamestown (1): 1941

 Stradbally (1): 1959

 St Joseph's (1): 1969

 Spink (1): 1989

 Harps (1): 1994

 The Rock (1): 1996

 Graiguecullen (1): 2007

 Ballyfin (1): 2014

 Rathdowney 1912...

References

2
Intermediate Gaelic football county championships